Abu Imran Musa ibn Isa ibn abi hajj (or hajjaj) al-Fasi (also simply known as Abu Imran al-Fasi; born between 975 and 978, died 8 June 1039) was a Moroccan Maliki faqīh born at Fez to a Berber or Arab family whose nisba is impossible to reconstruct.

Abu Imran al-Fasi was probably born between 975 and 978 at Fes. He went to Ifriqiya, where he settled in Kairouan and studied under al-Kabisi (died 1012). With al-Kabisi, he introduced the young Ibn Sharaf to poetry. Some time later, he stayed in Cordova with Ibn Abd al-Barr and followed the lectures of various scholars there, which his biographers list. He is regarded a saint by later Sufi mystics. He played an important role in the history of the Almoravid dynasty. It was his teaching in Qayrawan (Tunisia) that first stirred Yahya ibn Ibrahim, who was returning from the Pilgrimage and attended Abu Imran's courses. This inspired the foundation of the Almoravids. He wrote a commentary on the Mudawana of Sahnun.

Qadi Ayyad (d.544/1129), author of the Kitab Shifa bitarif huquq al-Mustapha (The Antidote in knowing the rights of the Chosen Prophet), hagiographied Abu Imran al-Fasi in his  Tadrib a-Madarik (Exercising Perception), an encyclopaedia of Maliki scholars.

See also
Waggag ibn Zallu al-Lamti
Sidi Mahrez

References

970s births
1039 deaths
Asharis
Berber writers
Moroccan Maliki scholars
People from Fez, Morocco
10th-century Berber people
11th-century Berber people
Berber scholars
11th-century Moroccan writers
10th-century Arabs
11th-century Arabs
11th-century Muslim theologians